Artyom Gankin (born ) is a Kazakhstani male recurve archer. He competed at the 2013 World Archery Championships in the men's individual event.

He is the brother of Denis Gankin.

References

External links
 

1989 births
Living people
Kazakhstani male archers
Place of birth missing (living people)
Archers at the 2010 Asian Games
Archers at the 2014 Asian Games
Asian Games competitors for Kazakhstan
21st-century Kazakhstani people